Alberto Vázquez may refer to:

Alberto Vázquez (singer) (born 1940), Mexican singer and film actor
Alberto Vazquez (American actor) (born 1955), American actor, screenwriter, director and producer
Alberto Vázquez-Figueroa (born 1936), Spanish writer
Alberto Vázquez Martínez (born 1967), Mexican politician
Alberto Vázquez (artist) (born 1980), Spanish comic book artist and filmmaker
Alberto Vázquez, football referee in 2013 Copa de México de Naciones